Pikangikum Water Aerodrome, formerly , was located on Pikangikum Lake on the Berens River adjacent to the Pikangikum First Nation, Ontario, Canada.

See also
 Pikangikum Airport

References

Defunct seaplane bases in Ontario